Rudat dance is a traditional dance of Sasak people in Lombok, West Nusa Tenggara, originated from Indonesia. This dance demonstrates  martial art movements.

Rudat dance is usually performed as a ceremonial welcoming dance to honor the guests and elders to a traditional ceremony.

See also

 Dance in Indonesia
 Kabasaran
 Kecak
 Zapin

References

Dances of Indonesia